The Sedgwick County Zoo is an AZA-accredited wildlife park and major attraction in Wichita, Kansas, United States.  Founded in 1971, with the help of the Sedgwick County Zoological Society, the zoo has quickly become recognized both nationally and internationally for its support of conservation programs and successful breeding of rare and endangered species.  Having over 3,000 animals of nearly 400 species, the zoo has slowly increased its visitors and now ranks as the number one outdoor tourist attraction in the state.

Exhibits

Downing Gorilla Forest

Downing Gorilla Forest starts out in a recreation of a small Congo village with exhibits for colobus monkeys, pink-backed pelicans, and white pelicans. Across a bridge is an exhibit for saddle-billed storks, as well as one for black crowned cranes and okapis. The main attraction is a large gorilla exhibit. They can be viewed in their indoor home, outside through large viewing windows or across a moat.

Pride of the Plains
Opened May 29, 2000, A path winds around exhibits of lions, red river hogs, and two exhibits of meerkats. Each exhibit has several views from all sides. The whole area has a kopje theme with giant boulders. At the end is an exhibit for African painted dogs.

Penguin Cove
Opened in 2007, Penguin Cove is the zoo's first marine exhibit, and home to a colony of Humboldt penguins. The $1.5 million exhibit features a  pool with rocky areas and coves on each side.

African Veldt
This exhibit features reticulated giraffes, African bush elephants, grévy's zebras, and eastern black rhinos.  On 11 March 2016, six African elephants arrived at the zoo from Eswatini to escape a drought. A new elephant exhibit named "The Reed Family Elephants of the Zambezi River Valley" opened in May of that year, housing all of the elephants.

Later, a male African elephant, Ajani, from Birmingham Zoo, joined the six female elephants for breeding purposes in May 2018.

Tiger Trek
This $3 million Asian themed naturalistic exhibit was opened in 2009, and houses Amur tigers, Malayan tigers, red pandas, bar-headed geese, brow-antlered deer, and more.

List of animals

Entrance
Caribbean flamingo
Greater flamingo

Children's Farm

Cessna Penguin Cove
Humboldt penguin
Inca tern
Grey gull

Amphibians and reptiles

Tropics

Africa

African Veldt

Pride of the Plains
African lion
African painted dog
Red river hog
Slender-tailed meerkat

The Reed Family Elephants of the Zambezi River Valley
African elephant

The Downing Gorilla Forest
Black crowned crane
Okapi
Saddle-billed stork
Western lowland gorilla

Asia

Asian forest

The Slawson Family Tiger Trek
Amur tiger
Red panda
Burmese brow-antlered deer

North America

Australia

South America

KOCH Orangutan and Chimpanzee Habitat

Chimpanzee
Sumatran orangutan

Future
As of June 2021, the zoo is currently making a new elephant management complex, as well as some new additions to the Amphibians and Reptiles building. On April 16th, 2022 they are expected to open a Shark and Stingray exhibit. They also have been expanding and moving the majority of exhibits, and planning on adding a lodge, water park, and savannah exhibit. A new entrance for the zoo opened on May 27, 2021.

Incidents
 In June 2005, two flamingos escaped from the zoo during a stormy night. Since then, one of the flamingos, identified as No. 492, has been spotted in Wisconsin, Louisiana, and Texas.
 On May 6, 2011, a first-grade student on a class field trip climbed over a four-foot fence then crossed the eight-foot gap of the Amur leopard exhibit. The boy was attacked. He suffered lacerations and puncture wounds to his head and neck before a bystander kicked the leopard in the head. The injuries were not considered life-threatening, and the zoo did not euthanize the endangered animal.

References

External links

 
 Sedgwick County Zoo raises ticket prices in 2017

Zoos in Kansas
Buildings and structures in Wichita, Kansas
Tourist attractions in Wichita, Kansas
Zoos established in 1971
1971 establishments in Kansas